Herrenhandtasche (or Herrénhandtasche) – as it says on the album cover – is the fourth studio album by the German punk rock band Wizo, released in 1995, and means "manpurse" in English.

Track listing 
 Hello - 0:19
 9247 - 3:15
 Poupée de Cire (cover of the France Gall song Poupée de cire, poupée de son) - 2:27
 Quadrat im Kreis (square in the circle) - 3:27
 Cruising  - 2:16
 Anrufbeantworter (answering machine) - 0:27
 Herrénhandtasche (man-purse) - 4:32
 Closet - 2:42
 Brief/Telefon/Tür (letter/phone/door) - 4:06
 Do You Remember Me? - 2:21

Lineup
 Axel Kurth - vocals, guitars
 Jörn Genserowski - bass, chorus
 Charly Zasko - drums, chorus

Trivia 

Herrenhandtasche literally means "manpurse" but it is also used in German referring to a sixpack (as in beer).

References 

1995 albums
Wizo albums